This Is the Magic Mile is a three-CD compilation album by Australian rock guitarist Ed Kuepper, released in 2005. The album is a 49-track retrospective of his output from 1991 to 2000. While Smile ... Pacific (2000) and Character Assassination (1994) are heavily represented—with 15 tracks drawn from the two albums—the collection also includes a 1994 single ("If I Had a Ticket"), several cuts from limited-release mail-order albums and two tracks from his side project The Aints.

The album includes a song, "Camooweal", that had originally been recorded for the Slim Dusty tribute album Not So Dusty (1998), which had also featured Midnight Oil, Mental as Anything and Cold Chisel's Don Walker. Other covers included AC/DC's "Highway to Hell" and Eric Burdon's "When I Was Young".

Track listing
(All songs by Ed Kuepper except where noted)

References

2005 compilation albums
Ed Kuepper albums
Hot Records albums